Shirley & Company was an American disco group, consisting of Shirley Goodman (1936–2005), Jason Alvarez (now a pastor), Walter Morris, Bernadette Randle, Seldon Powell, Jonathan Williams, Kenny Jeremiah, and Clarence Oliver.

They topped the U.S. Dance chart in 1975 with "Shame, Shame, Shame" (U.S. Pop #12), and did extremely well in Europe: the song reached #6 in the UK Singles Chart and #1 in Austria, Belgium, Germany, and the Netherlands. The follow-up, "Cry Cry Cry", made it to #91 on the Hot 100 later that year.

History
"Shame, Shame, Shame" was written and produced by Sylvia Robinson, who was a co-owner of the All Platinum record label. It was intended for All Platinum artist Donnie Elbert. It was Robinson who paired veteran blues vocalist Shirley Goodman with All Platinum artist Jesus Alvarez. The track, with its prominent use of the Bo Diddley beat, was one of the first international disco hits and reached number 12 on the Billboard charts. It also hit number one on the soul singles chart for one week. "Shame, Shame, Shame" also went number one on the disco/dance chart for four weeks. The full-length LP Shame, Shame, Shame was recorded subsequently and came out in 1975.

The lead singer Shirley Goodman, was one half of the duo Shirley and Lee who had a mega hit 18 years earlier, in 1956, writing and recording the song "Let The Good Times Roll" for Aladdin Records. Jesus Alvarez changed his name to Jason Alvarez and became a pastor for the Love of Jesus Family Church. He recorded several gospel albums.

Discography

Singles
1974 "Shame, Shame, Shame" (Austria #1 / Belgium #1 / Germany #1 / Netherlands #1 / Norway #9 / Switzerland #2 / US #12 / US Dance #1 / US Soul #1) 
1975 More Shame 
1975 I Like to Dance 
1975 Cry, Cry, Cry (US #91) 
1975 Disco Shirley (Belgium #27 / Germany #41 / Netherlands #12) 
1975 Mr. Frenchman

Albums
1975 Shame, Shame, Shame

See also
List of number-one dance hits (United States)
List of artists who reached number one on the US Dance chart
List of 1970s one-hit wonders in the United States
List of disco artists (S-Z)
One-hit wonders in the UK
List of performers on Top of the Pops

References

American disco groups
American dance music groups
All Platinum artists